Batteries Not Included is a British comedy programme showcasing the world's strangest gadgets. It was broadcast on Dave who commissioned the show. It was made by independent production company Liberty Bell. John Cleese hosted with Phill Jupitus narrating.  The programme featured a rotating panel of contributing celebrities (mainly comedians) who tested out the gadgets and brought on their own favourite gadgets to discuss.

References

External links
Batteries Not Included at UKTV.co.uk

Dave (TV channel) original programming
2000s British comedy television series
2008 British television series debuts
2008 British television series endings